Paul Lance Barnes (born 16 November 1967) is an English former professional footballer who played as a striker in the Football League for Notts County, Stoke City, Chesterfield, York City, Birmingham City, Burnley, Huddersfield Town, Bury and Doncaster Rovers.

Career
Born in Leicester, Barnes completed an apprenticeship with Notts County before signing a professional contract in November 1985, making his debut in February 1986. He played five seasons with the Magpies, scoring 19 goals in 67 appearances and helping them on their way to promotion in 1989–90. He joined Stoke City on transfer deadline day in 1989–90, being one of a large number of players signed by Alan Ball in an attempt to avoid relegation. Barnes played in five matches as Stoke failed to mount a revival and were relegated to the third tier. He played in seven matches for Stoke in 1990–91, and also had a short spell on loan at Chesterfield. Under Lou Macari in 1991–92 he found himself in the reserves due to the form of Wayne Biggins and Mark Stein. He played in 18 matches scoring four goals and was an unused substitute in the 1992 Football League Trophy Final. York City manager John Ward spotted Barnes in Stoke's reserves and signed him in July 1992.

Barnes began scoring goals for York quickly and he netted 21 times as York won promotion in 1993. The following year, he scored 24 times and won the Clubman of the Year trophy. In September 1995, he hit the national headlines when he scored twice in City's 3–0 victory over Manchester United at Old Trafford in a second-round League Cup tie, and he almost scored a hat trick, but his third goal was ruled offside. Barnes was eventually sold to Birmingham City for a fee of £350,000 in March 1996.

Six months later, Burnley paid a club record fee of £375,000 for his services. He scored 30 goals in 65 league matches for the Turf Moor club, which included all five goals in a 5–2 victory over Stockport County. Barnes left Burnley in January 1998 for Huddersfield Town in a swap deal with Andy Payton, but failed to establish himself in the Huddersfield side and left for Bury in March 1999 for a £40,000 fee.

In 2003, he helped Doncaster Rovers gain promotion back to the Football League from the Football Conference, winning the Golden Boot in the process. Barnes then signed for non-league Tamworth, before finishing his playing career at Hinckley United.

Personal life
Barnes' son, Harvey Barnes, also became a professional footballer.

Career statistics
Source:

A.  The "Other" column constitutes appearances and goals in the Conference League Cup, FA Trophy, Football League play-offs and Football League Trophy.

Honours
York City
Football League Third Division play-offs: 1993

Doncaster Rovers
Football Conference play-offs: 2003

Individual
York City Clubman of the Year: 1993–94
Football Conference Team of the Year: 2002–03
Football Conference Goalscorer of the Year: 2002–03
Football Conference Goalscorer of the Month (2): December 2002, February 2003

References

External links

 

1967 births
Living people
Footballers from Leicester
English footballers
Association football forwards
Notts County F.C. players
Stoke City F.C. players
Chesterfield F.C. players
York City F.C. players
Birmingham City F.C. players
Burnley F.C. players
Huddersfield Town A.F.C. players
Bury F.C. players
Nuneaton Borough F.C. players
Doncaster Rovers F.C. players
Tamworth F.C. players
Hinckley United F.C. players
English Football League players
National League (English football) players